Milan Mirković (born 7 April 1985) is a Serbian handball player for Vojvodina.

Career
After playing for five years with Sintelon (later known as Tarkett), Mirković moved to Slovenia and joined Koper in October 2008. He helped the club win the Slovenian Cup in April 2009. After spending one year with MKB Veszprém in Hungary, Mirković returned to Koper in the 2010–11 season, winning the Slovenian First League and EHF Challenge Cup. He subsequently played for two years with fellow Slovenian team Maribor Branik. After returning to Serbia and winning the championship with Vojvodina in the 2013–14 season, Mirković moved to Israel and joined Maccabi Tel Aviv. He signed with fellow Israeli team Ramat HaSharon in July 2016.

Honours
Koper
 Slovenian First League: 2010–11
 Slovenian Cup: 2008–09, 2010–11
 EHF Challenge Cup: 2010–11
MKB Veszprém
 Nemzeti Bajnokság I: 2009–10
 Magyar Kupa: 2009–10
Vojvodina
 Serbian Handball Super League: 2013–14, 2018–19
 Serbian Handball Cup: 2018–19
 Serbian Handball Super Cup: 2013, 2018, 2019

References

External links
 EHF record
 SEHA record
 MKSZ record

1985 births
Living people
Sportspeople from Novi Sad
Serbian male handball players
RK Sintelon players
Veszprém KC players
RK Vojvodina players
Expatriate handball players
Serbian expatriate sportspeople in Slovenia
Serbian expatriate sportspeople in Hungary
Serbian expatriate sportspeople in Israel